Kusruthykuttan is a 1966 Indian Malayalam-language film,  directed by M. Krishnan Nair and produced by Muhammad Assam. The film stars Thikkurissy Sukumaran Nair, Ambika, Suresh Varma and Sukumari. The film had musical score by Vijayabhaskar. This film was inspired by the Bollywood film Deeksha.

Cast
Thikkurissy Sukumaran Nair as Madhavan Nair
Ambika as Lakshmi
Suresh Varma as Gopi
Sukumari
Adoor Bhasi
Muthukulam Raghavan Pillai
B. N. Nambiar
Pankajavalli as Lakshmi's mother
Suresh Kumar

Soundtrack
The music was composed by Vijayabhaskar and the lyrics were written by P. Bhaskaran.

References

External links
 

1966 films
1960s Malayalam-language films
Films directed by M. Krishnan Nair